Labour of Love II is the ninth album and second covers album by UB40, released in 1989. The album contained two top-ten Billboard Hot 100 hits – "Here I Am (Come and Take Me)" peaked at No. 7, "The Way You Do the Things You Do" peaked at No. 6 – and "Kingston Town" reached No. 4 on the UK Singles Chart.

Track listing
 "Here I Am (Come and Take Me)" (original by Al Green) – 4:00
 "Tears from My Eyes" (Teddy Davis) – 3:50
 "Groovin'" (Byron Lee) – 3:50
 "The Way You Do the Things You Do" (original by the Temptations) – 3:02
 "Wear You to the Ball" (original by the Paragons) – 3:31
 "Singer Man" (original by the Kingstonians) – 3:51
 "Kingston Town" (original by Lord Creator) – 3:48
 "Baby" (original by the Heptones) – 3:22
 "Wedding Day" (Harold Logan, John Patton, Lloyd Price) – 3:12
 "Sweet Cherrie" (Keith "Honey Boy" Williams) – 3:16
 "Stick By Me" (original by Shep and the Limelites) – 3:45
 "Just Another Girl" (original by Ken Boothe) – 3:33
 "Homely Girl" (original by the Chi-Lites) – 3:24
 "Impossible Love" (Keith "Honey Boy" Williams) – 5:10

Personnel
UB40
Ali Campbell – lead vocals and backing vocals, rhythm guitar
Robin Campbell – lead and rhythm guitar, backing vocals
Astro – trumpet, toast and backing vocals
Earl Falconer – bass and synthesizer
Michael Virtue – synthesizers and sampler
Brian Travers – saxophones
Norman Hassan – trombone
Jim Brown – electronic drums and drum machine
with:
Patrick Tenyue – trumpet
Henry Tenyue – trombone

Technical
Gary Parchment, John Shaw – engineer, programming, mixing
Barry Kamen – cover painting

Charts

Certifications

References

1989 albums
UB40 albums
Covers albums
Virgin Records albums